Daniel J. "Danny" Walkowitz (born 1942) is an American historian who specializes in labor history, urban history, and public history. He holds a joint appointment with the Department of History and the Department of Social and Cultural Analysis at New York University. He co-founded with Paul Mattingly the Archives and Public History graduate program and directed, from 1989 to 2004, the Metropolitan Studies undergraduate program.

According to Barbara Weinstein, NYU's History department chair, Walkowitz's well-celebrated New York City: A Social History course "has been one of the most consistently attractive offerings" by the department. It is featured as one of NYU Open Education's courses available for free streaming. Another course he offers, Walking New York, is rated by the student newspaper NYU Local as one of the "semester's best classes" college wide.

Biography
Walkowitz received a B.A. in English (1964) and a Ph.D. in History (1972) from the University of Rochester, where he studied under Herbert Gutman. He taught at Rutgers–New Brunswick before coming to New York University in 1978. His wife, Judith, is a professor of British History at Johns Hopkins University.

He is affiliated with the American Historical Association, the Organization of American Historians, the National Council on Public History, and the American Studies Association.

Documentary and filmography
Along with his interest in public history, Walkowitz has also worked on several documentary and film projects, consistent with his effort in making the past accessible to a broad audience. He directed or co-directed The Molders of Troy (1980), Public History Today (1990), and Perestroika From Below (1991). He also served as advisor on The Wobblies and The Good Fight, among others.

Awards
 Mellon Fellow, University of Pennsylvania, 1978-79 (declined)
 National Endowment for the Humanities, Media Division, 1976, 1977, 1980
 National Council for Soviet and East European Research, 1989, 1990
 Stanford Humanities Center, Affiliate Fellow, 2001–02

Selected works

References

American historians
University of Rochester alumni